Raúl Domínguez may refer to:
Raúl Domínguez Rex (born 1970), Mexican politician
Raúl Domínguez (cyclist) (born 1972), Cuban retired cyclist
Raúl Domínguez (footballer) (born 1986), Spanish footballer